The 1987 McDonald's Open took place at MECCA Arena in Milwaukee, United States. This was the first edition of the McDonald's Championship and was a round-robin competition between 3 teams: Milwaukee Bucks, Tracer Milano and the USSR. The decider was played between Milwaukee Bucks and the Soviet Union on 25 October 1987 and had the feel of an Olympic Final with highlights of past national team encounters between USA and the USSR in other sports showed on the court's video screen.

Background
The three teams competed for a $50,000 prize and a trophy emblazoned with the moon-shaped face of former company mascot Mac Tonight in a brand new competition sanctioned by FIBA that had just omitted the term Amateur from its acronym. The tournament was of extra importance as for the first time a Soviet Union team would face an NBA club.
The tournament came at an interesting time in terms of the two nations’ basketball relationship during the Cold War. NBA teams had recently begun drafting Soviet players with the hopes of holding onto their rights and perhaps one day signing them to contracts. Sarunas Marciulionis would go on to be the first Soviet player to sign with an NBA team, while Alexander Volkov would play a couple years with Atlanta Hawks (Arvydas Sabonis was injured for the McDonald’s Open). At the same time the Bucks entered  the tournament without Sidney Moncrief, Jay Humphries, Ricky Pierce, Craig Hodges and John Lucas II who were unavailable due to injuries and contract issues and Junior Bridgeman had just announced his retirement. Tracer Milano were Europe's reigning champions with former NBA players in its roster, and Italian legend Dino Meneghin. 
As Borislav Stankovic had sanctioned the tournament FIBA Europe sent one of its best referees for the games, Costas Rigas. Referee Darell Garretson represented NBA in the competition.

Participants

Games
October 23, 1987

|}

October 24, 1987

|}

October 25, 1987

|}

Rosters

Milwaukee Bucks: Jack Sikma, Randy Breuer, Paul Pressey, Terry Cummings, Jerry Reynolds - Charles Davis, Pace Mannion, JJ Weber, Paul Mokeski, Keith Smith, John Stroeder, Bob McCann, Dudley Bradley, Winston Garland. Coach: Del Harris
Soviet Nationals: Tiit Sokk, Viktor Pankrashkin, Valery Tikhonenko, Aleksandr Volkov, Sarunas Marciulionis - Alexander Belostenny, Sergei Tarakanov, Valdemaras Chomičius, Rimas Kurtinaitis, Valdis Valters, Sergei Grishaev, Goborov. Coach: Aleksandr Gomelsky
Tracer Milano: Bob McAdoo, Riccardo Pittis, Fausto Bargna, Rickey Brown, Mike D'Antoni, Dino Meneghin, Roberto Premier, Massimiliano Aldi, Pieto Montecchia, Mario Governa. Coach: Franco Casalini

Final standings

Sources
Bucks vs Soviet Union
Bucks vs Tracer
Soviets vs Tracer
Historical
História 1987

External links
NBA International Pre-Season and Regular-Season Games
List of champions at a-d-c

1987–88
1987–88 in American basketball
1987–88 in Italian basketball
1987–88 in Soviet basketball
International basketball competitions hosted by the United States
Soviet Union national basketball team games